Rubén Cousillas Fuse (born 9 May 1957 in Roque Pérez) is an Argentinian football assistant manager and former player, who is assistant manager at Betis to Manuel Pellegrini.

Playing career
Cousillas started his career at San Lorenzo de Almagro with whom he won promotion to Primera División del Fútbol Argentino in the year 1982. In addition, he also played for Millonarios Fútbol Club in Bogota, with which he won three Colombian titles. He also played for Vélez Sársfield, Club Deportivo Mandiyú and Argentinos Juniors as well as Huachipato, where he ended his playing career.

Management and coaching career
Cousillas began his career as a coach for Talleres de Córdoba, before moving on to Argentinos Juniors, where he worked under Chiche Sosa.

In 1998, Cousillas returned to his former playing club San Lorenzo, to become assistant to Oscar Ruggeri. When Ruggeri was replaced by Manuel Pellegrini, Cousillas struck a great working partnership with the Chilean, and followed him to River Plate, Villareal, Real Madrid and Málaga.

On 14 June 2013, it was announced that Cousillas would be joining Manuel Pellegrini at Manchester City as co-assistant, alongside Brian Kidd.

Cousillas took caretaker charge of Manchester City in their 2-1 UEFA Champions League defeat to FC Barcelona due to manager Manuel Pellegrini having a 3 match UEFA ban for criticizing the referee in the first leg.

When Pellegrini left Manchester City in June 2016 on the expiry of his contract, Cousillas also left along with the remainder of Pellegrini's staff (not including Brian Kidd). 
In 2018 he joined Pellegrini as a coach at West Ham United leaving in December 2019 when Pellegrini was sacked.

References

1957 births
Living people
Manchester City F.C. non-playing staff
West Ham United F.C. non-playing staff
Argentine footballers
Association football goalkeepers
Argentine expatriate sportspeople in England
Argentine expatriate football managers
Argentine expatriate sportspeople in Spain
Argentine expatriate sportspeople in China
Expatriate footballers in Colombia
Argentine expatriate footballers
Association football coaches
Sportspeople from Buenos Aires Province